Ever since 1970, the Conservatives had held the mayor's position in the municipality. 

In Henrik Rasmussen had secured his 2nd full term after the Conservatives won 8 seats and an absolute majority. 

In this election, Conservatives would gain 1 seat, and win 9 of the 15 seats. Therefore Henrik Rasmussen had an easy path to continue as the mayor, and would do so.  

This would be the only election that Venstre would not contest. This may have been a result of having failed to win representation in the 2017 election.

Electoral system
For elections to Danish municipalities, a number varying from 9 to 31 are chosen to be elected to the municipal council. The seats are then allocated using the D'Hondt method and a closed list proportional representation.
Vallensbæk Municipality had 9 seats in 2021

Unlike in Danish General Elections, in elections to municipal councils, electoral alliances are allowed.

Electoral alliances 

Electoral Alliance 1

Electoral Alliance 2

Results

Notes

References

Vallensbæk